R.P. Sharma Institute of Technology (RPSIT) (formerly Patna Institute of Technology)  is an engineering and management college in Patna, the state capital of Bihar. It was founded by R.P. Sharma (founder of Patna Educational Development Trust) in 1980. The institution offers full-time B.Tech. and MBA courses.

It is affiliated with Aryabhatta Knowledge University, Patna.

About chairman

Campus
The campus of RPSIT is spread over 10 acres of land situated on West Bailey Road near RPS road in Danapur Patna.
This location has many colleges and schools of the Patna Educational Development Trust. It is one of the oldest privately owned engineering college in Bihar and the first in Patna.

Departments
 Computer Science and Engineering
 Electronics and Communications Engineering
 Electrical and Electronics Engineering
 Mechanical engineering
 Civil engineering
 MBA Department

Admission
Admission to undergraduate courses is made on the basis of merit in a competitive examination conducted by the Bihar Combined Entrance Competitive Examination Board. And 15% management quota seats filled by college by its own examination test.

Library
The college has a library containing  books and magazines available for college students.

See also
 List of institutions of higher education in Bihar
 Education in Patna
 Education in Bihar

References

External links
 Rpsit.org.in
 Dst.bih.nic.in

Engineering colleges in Bihar
Universities and colleges in Patna
Educational institutions established in 1980
1980 establishments in Bihar
Colleges affiliated to Aryabhatta Knowledge University